Pavoclinus laurentii, the rippled klipfish, is a species of clinid found from Inhambane, Mozambique to Port Alfred, South Africa where it prefers weed-grown tide pools.  It can reach a maximum length of  TL. The specific name honours Master Lawrence Robinson, who caught type specimens at Winklespruit, the use of the term master indicates that he was probably younger than 12 years old at the time.

References

External links
 Photograph

laurentii
Fish described in 1908